Galactic lens in the structure of galaxies a component with an almost uniform distribution of the surface brightness, which can be noticeable in the region between the bulge and the disk. Most likely, these structures arise from the "blurring" of the bars.

Synopsis
The lens in the structure of galaxies is an elliptical-shaped component with a nearly uniform distribution of surface brightness and sharp boundaries, whose contribution can be seen in the region between the bulge and the disk, and sometimes in other regions as well.

The lenses are triaxial ellipsoids: in the direction perpendicular to the galactic plane, they are flattened, but not as much as the disks, and in the projection on the disk plane, the ratio of their major and minor axes is on average 0.9.

It is known that lenses are closely connected with bars and are often found in galaxies with bars - in 54% of SB0-SBa galaxies and in 76% of SBab-SBc galaxies. In those cases when a galaxy contains both a bar and a lens, their sizes most often coincide.

Lenses most likely arise from bars, although the existence of some types of lenses cannot be explained by this. Two mechanisms are known that can lead to the formation of lenses. The first consists in the fact that over time the bar may become more axisymmetric, and not necessarily immediately all the matter of the bar is redistributed in this way, as often observed galaxies, where there is both a bar and a lens. The second is that lenses, like bars, arise in the presence of bar-forming instability.

Lenses have been known since at least 1959, starting with the work of Gérard de Vaucouleurs, in which he proposed his scheme for classifying galaxies.

References

Galaxies